The following is a list of notable Bush family members:

Notable members 

 James Smith Bush (1825–1889), father of Samuel P. Bush

 Samuel Prescott Bush (1863–1948), father of Prescott Bush and son of James Smith Bush
 Prescott Sheldon Bush (1895–1972), Samuel P. Bush's son, U.S. Senator, USGA chair
 George Herbert Walker Bush (1924–2018), Prescott Bush Sr.'s second son; 41st president of the United States, 43rd vice president, CIA director
 Barbara Pierce Bush (1925–2018), wife of George H. W., Second Lady and later First Lady of the U.S.
 George Walker Bush (born 1946), George H. W. Bush's eldest son, 43rd president of the United States and (earlier) 46th Governor of Texas
 Laura Lane Welch Bush (born 1946), wife of George W. and First Lady, librarian
 Barbara Pierce Bush Coyne (born 1981), daughter of George and Laura Bush and twin sister of Jenna, health care activist, chair of Global Health Corps
 Jenna Welch Bush Hager (born 1981), daughter of George and Laura and twin sister of Barbara, NBC News correspondent; married to Henry Chase Hager, son of former Lieutenant Governor of Virginia John H. Hager
 Pauline Robinson "Robin" Bush (1949–1953), George H. W. Bush's second child and first daughter; died of leukaemia near school-age
 John Ellis "Jeb" Bush (born 1953), George H. W. Bush's second son, 43rd Governor of Florida; married to Columba Garnica Gallo
 George Prescott Bush (born 1976), son of Jeb Bush, 28th commissioner of the Texas General Land Office since 2015; married to Amanda Williams Bush
 Neil Mallon Bush (born 1955), third son of George H. W. Bush; businessman; married Sharon Smith, & divorced in April 2003; married to Maria Andrews 
 Lauren Pierce Bush (born 1984), daughter of Neil Bush and Sharon Smith; model for Tommy Hilfiger; married to David Lauren
 Sharon Smith. Married to Julian LeFevre on March 2, 2019.
 Marvin Pierce Bush (born 1956), fourth son of George H. W. Bush; venture capitalist
 Dorothy Walker Bush Koch (born 1959), second daughter of George H. W. Bush
 Nancy Walker Bush Ellis (1926–2021), Prescott Bush Sr.'s third child and only daughter, insurance executive
 Alexander Ellis III (born 1949), son of Nancy Bush Ellis and Alexander Ellis II
 John Prescott Ellis (born February 3, 1953), son of Nancy Bush Ellis and Alexander Ellis II; media consultant; married to Susan Smith Ellis
 Josiah "Joe" Ellis (born 1958), son of Nancy Bush Ellis and Alexander Ellis II; President, Chairman and CEO of the Denver Broncos, two-time Super Bowl champion as a member of the Broncos' front office
 Jonathan James Bush (1931–2021), Prescott Bush Sr.'s fourth child; banker; married to Josephine Bush (née Bradley)
 Jonathan S. Bush (born March 10, 1969), son of Jonathan Bush, CEO of Athenahealth; divorced from Sarah Selden; married to Fay Bush in September 2018
 William Hall "Billy" Bush (born October 17, 1971), son of Jonathan Bush; a former Access Hollywood host; forced out of NBC-news job October 2016 in allegations about Donald Trump; divorced from Sydney Bush
 William Henry Trotter "Bucky" Bush (1938–2018), Prescott Bush Sr.'s fifth child; married to Patricia Bush (née Redfearn, 1938-2015); banker

See also 

 List of lists of political families

References 

Bush family
People from Texas
First Families of the United States